Isac von Krusenstierna (born 14 January 1998) is a Swedish orienteering competitor who represents the club OK Kåre.

He won a gold medal in sprint at the 2021 World Orienteering Championships in Doksy, ahead of Kasper Fosser. In the 2016 Junior World Orienteering Championships, he received three medals, with a silver in the relay event and bronze medals in the classic and sprint. He won an additional silver medal in the 2018 relay event, held in Hungary.

References

1998 births
Living people
Swedish orienteers
Male orienteers
Foot orienteers
Swedish nobility
Junior World Orienteering Championships medalists